Joe Batchelor (born 28 October 1994) is an English professional rugby league footballer who plays as a  forward for St Helens in the Super League and England at international level.

He has played for the Coventry Bears and the York City Knights in League 1. Batchelor has spent time on loan from Saints at York and the Leigh Centurions in the Betfred Championship.

Background
Born in Wakefield, West Yorkshire, England, Batchelor played junior rugby league with Dewsbury Celtic. 

He is the brother of James Batchelor who plays for Hull KR in the Super League.

Playing career

Early career
Batchelor started his career as an academy player at Sheffield Eagles. In 2015, he spent a year in Australia, where he played for Bathurst St Patrick's in the Group 10 Rugby League competition. He returned to the Eagles in 2016, but the club's reserve team was discontinued shortly afterwards. After contacting Coventry Bears coach Tom Tsang, he agreed to join the club, and made his professional debut in May 2016 against Doncaster.

York City Knights
In December 2016, York City Knights announced that they had signed Batchelor. He debuted for the club in a Challenge Cup match against Egremont Rangers, scoring a try in a 48–8 win. He scored 15 tries in 21 appearances in his first season at the club, and was named as the York Press Player of the Year for 2017. Despite attracting interest from other clubs, he agreed to sign a new contract with York for the following season. In the 2018 season, he was the club's top try scorer with 23 tries in 27 games, helping the club win promotion to the Championship.

St Helens
In May 2018, Batchelor agreed to join Super League side St Helens, signing a three-year contract with the club ahead of the 2019 season. During his first season at the club, he returned to York City Knights on loan. The initial one-month loan was extended for the whole season, but Saints exercised the option to recall him. He made his Super League debut for St Helens against Hull in April 2019. Later in the season, he also played for Leigh Centurions on a dual registration deal. Batchelor's first team opportunities at St Helens were limited, and he made only eight appearances during his first two seasons at the club.

His breakthrough came in the 2021 season, becoming a regular starter in the second-row for the club following the departures of Zeb Taia and Dom Peyroux. On 17 July 2021, he played for St Helens in their 26–12 win against Castleford Tigers in the 2021 Challenge Cup Final. In August 2021, Batchelor extended his contract with Saints until the end of the 2023 season. On 9 October 2021, he played for St Helens in their 12–10 victory over Catalans Dragons in the 2021 Super League Grand Final.

On 24 September 2022, Batchelor played for St Helens in their 2022 Super League Grand Final victory over Leeds Rhinos.

England
Batchelor was one of five St Helens players selected by England in the squad for the 2021 Rugby League World Cup.

References

External links

St Helens profile
Saints Heritage Society profile
SL profile
England profile

1994 births
Living people
Coventry Bears players
England national rugby league team players
English rugby league players
Leigh Leopards players
Rugby league second-rows
Rugby league players from Wakefield
St Helens R.F.C. players
York City Knights players